Passage Island may refer to:

 Passage Island (British Columbia)
 Passage Island (Tasmania)
 Falkland Islands
 Passage Islands
 Passage Island, Falkland Islands, Byron Sound
 Passage Islands, alternate name for the Spanish Virgin Islands
 Passage Island (Michigan)